The Union School is a historic building located at 516-518 Bethlehem Pike in the Fort Washington section of Whitemarsh Township, Pennsylvania, in the United States.  Built in 1773, the Union School was one of the very earliest public schools in Pennsylvania, and the first that did not discriminate based on social position or religious preference.  The building is sometimes referred to as the "cradle of free education."

As part of his will, local Quaker businessman Samuel Morris stipulated that a sum of money from his estate be set for the building of a school and a teacher's salary.  The school was to provide for free education for all within a one and a half-mile radius of Hope Lodge, his country mansion.  After Morris' death in 1770, his brother Joshua had the school built.

The original section was built in 1773, and is a 2 1/2-story building measuring 23 feet wide by 48 feet long.  The school and attached schoolmaster's house are constructed of fieldstone portions of which are covered in painted stucco.

In 1792, the Union School was incorporated as the Union School in Whitemarsh.  The school was in continuous use from 1773 until 1936, except for a brief period in 1873 when it served as a lyceum.  The trust fund established by Samuel Morris remains in existence today, supporting education in the townships of Whitpain, Whitemarsh and Upper Dublin in Pennsylvania.

The Union School has been listed on the U.S. National Register of Historic Places since 1980.

Today, the Union School building is a privately owned residence.  However, the museum of the Fort Washington Historical Society in the Clifton House contains a replica of the school room.

References

See also
Clifton House

School buildings on the National Register of Historic Places in Pennsylvania
Educational institutions established in 1773
Infrastructure completed in 1773
Schools in Montgomery County, Pennsylvania
1773 establishments in Pennsylvania
National Register of Historic Places in Montgomery County, Pennsylvania